Cernička Mala is an uninhabited settlement in Croatia.

See also
 List of former populated places in Croatia

Ghost towns in Croatia